"Sab Sitaray Humaray" is the official anthem of the 2023 Pakistan Super League, the eighth season of Pakistan Super League. It is produced and composed by Abdullah Siddiqui, while sung by Shae Gill and Asim Azhar along with the rap part by Faris Shafi.

Background
On 7 February 2023, the PCB announced that Asim Azhar, Shae Gill and Faris Shafi would be singing this anthem and Abdullah Siddiqui would be producing it. This is Azhar's second anthem after "Tayyar Hain" and Siddiqui's second production after "Agay Dekh".

It was earlier reported that Ali Sethi was set for the anthem, after "Pasoori", his duet with Gill in #CokeStudio14, was largely appreciated. However, his contract was revoked due to possible conflict of interest as his father, Najam Sethi, became PCB Management Committee's Chairman.

Release
It was released on 11 February 2023, with music video directed by Awais Gohar. Taniya Hasan of Dawn commented that the cinematography seems to be inspired by Diriliş: Ertuğrul and Game of Thrones.

Opening ceremony
Multan hosted the opening ceremony for the first time, with management by Multan Waste Management Company (MCMW). Along with the virtual reality, the ceremony also featured augmented reality and drone art for the first time.

Aima Baig opened with "Qaumi Taranah", followed by Muhammad Aurangzeb, CEO HBL Pakistan, and Najam Sethi addressing the audience. Then Sahir Ali Bagga performed along with Baig, followed by a performance by dance group named The Colony. Afterwards, the anthem was played with Gill, Azhar, and Shafi on-stage, and the ceremony was closed with the fireworks.

See also

 List of Pakistan Super League anthems

References

2023 Pakistan Super League
2023
2023 songs
Song recordings produced by Abdullah Siddiqui